The Search for Bridey Murphy is a 1956 American drama film directed by Noel Langley and starring Teresa Wright, Louis Hayward and Nancy Gates, based on the best-selling book by Morey Bernstein. It is inspired by the story of American Virginia Tighe, who believed herself to formerly have been Bridey Murphy, a nineteenth century Irishwoman, in a case believed to be that of cryptomnesia. It was the only Hollywood film to directed by Langley, best known as a screenwriter.

Cast
 Teresa Wright as Ruth Simmons
 Louis Hayward as 	Morey Bernstein
 Nancy Gates as Hazel Bernstein
 Kenneth Tobey as 	Rex Simmons
 Richard Anderson as Dr. Deering
 Tom McKee as Catlett
 Janet Riley as Lois Morgan
 Charles Boaz as Jerry Thomas
 Lawrence Fletcher as Cranmer
 Charles Maxwell as 	Father Bernard
 Walter Kingsford as Professor
 Noel Leslie as 	Edgar Cayce
 James Bell as Hugh Lynn Cayce
 Eilene Janssen as Bridey Murphy at Age 15
 Bradford Jackson as	Brian MacCarthy at Age 17
 James Kirkwood as Brian MacCarthy at Age 68
 Hallene Hill as Bridey Murphy at Age 66

References

Bibliography
 Indick, William. Psycho Thrillers: Cinematic Explorations of the Mysteries of the Mind. McFarland, 2006.

External links
 

1956 films
1956 drama films
American drama films
Paramount Pictures films
Films directed by Noel Langley
1950s English-language films
1950s American films
American black-and-white films